ru:Острова-«спутники» Урупа
The Offshore islets of Urup include several tiny islets and rocks scattered around the coast of Urup island, which in turn is a part of Greater Kuril Chain in Sakhalin Oblast of Russia.

History 
In 1855 the islets together with Urup were confirmed as part of Russian Empire on conditions of Treaty of Shimoda.

In 1875 they were incorporated into Empire of Japan on conditions of Treaty of Saint Petersburg.

After World War II the islets have become part of the USSR and then Russia. They mostly remained unnamed until Russian Geographical Society made expedition to the area in 2012.

References 

Islands of the Kuril Islands